Ladná (until 1950 Lanštorf) is a municipality and village in Břeclav District in the South Moravian Region of the Czech Republic. It has about 1,200 inhabitants.

Sights

The landmark of Ladná is the Church of Saint Michael the Archangel. It was built in the Neoromanesque style in 1911–1914.

References

Villages in Břeclav District